Nói Síríus is a family-owned chocolate and confection manufacturer in Iceland that was founded in 1920. Hallgrímur Benediktsson took over as main owner in the 1920s, and his grandson, Finnur Geirsson, was the company's president up until late 2021 when Lasse Ruud-Hansen took over after Orkla had Bought the rest of the shares in early 2021. Nói Síríus is Iceland's biggest candy producer and its candies have been a traditional part of camping trips since 1933, along with stockfish. 
  
The company produces Tópas and Opal, "fresh breath products" known for being somewhat bitter and soothing a sore throat with menthol and eucalyptus, as well as pastilles, sugar twists, assorted chocolates (a Christmas tradition) and Easter eggs. The chocolates come in dark and milk chocolate varieties as well as bars with nuts and raisins, whole hazelnuts, raisins and liquorice chips. The company also produces a "Little Imps" lines for children that includes "candy covered chocolate drops, hot and spicy pepper drops, fruity jellies with a candy shell or colourful little gum drops".

Nói Síríus candies are sold domestically in Iceland and exported, primarily to Russia and the United States. Smaller quantities are shipped to Denmark and the Netherlands under the Oxydent and Fakta brands.

Nói Síríus has also been publicly accused of using artwork created by independent artists for their opal packaging without permission.

International expansion
In the late 1990s the company purchased a stake in Laima, Latvia's largest candy manufacturer, but sold it in 2004. In March 2006 the company bought English chocolate company, Elizabeth Shaw, but sold it in May 2009 and focused on its own brands.

In August 2019, Orkla acquired a 20% minority stake in Nói Siríus.

Candy culture
Chocolate is a mainstay of Icelandic culture. Nói Síríus produces 300,000 chocolate Easter eggs in a nation of 340,000 people. The Easter eggs are made at the company's Reykjavík plant, and a note with a saying is put into each egg. Icelandic liqueurs bearing the Tópas and Opal name have also been introduced, achieving some acclaim, with filmmaker Quentin Tarantino's description of them as "the worst drink on earth" after an evening imbibing them.

The company also made news in 2007 for a controversial marketing campaign and promotion stunt that had people join a Labor Day demonstration with signs labeled with Nói-Síríus-produced Tópas candy while shouting advertising slogans.

References

External links
 

Chocolate companies
Food and drink companies established in 1920
Companies based in Reykjavík
Confectionery companies
Food and drink companies of Iceland
Icelandic brands
1920 establishments in Iceland
Family-owned companies